Calling card may refer to:

 Visiting card, a card used socially to signify a visit made to a house if the occupant is absent, or as an introduction for oneself; the precursor to the modern business card
 Business card, a small card with business information that is given for convenience and as a memory aid
 Tart card, an ad stuck to a phone box to advertise the services of a call girl
 Calling card (crime), a signature token or characteristic of a crime used by a serial criminal
 Telephone card, a small card, usually resembling a credit card, used to pay for telephone services
 Calling Card, a 1976 album by Irish blues-rock musician Rory Gallagher